Murray Parker may refer to:
 Murray Parker (cricketer)
 Murray Parker (broadcaster)